Samuel A. Carlisi also known as "Black Sam" and "Sam Wings" (December 15, 1914 – January 2, 1997), was an American gangster who was the boss of the Chicago Outfit criminal organization Between 1989 – 1996. Sam Carlisi's brother Roy was a caporegime in the Buffalo crime family, otherwise known as the Magaddino crime family. Roy was close to legendary Buffalo Mafia boss Stefano Magaddino, which gave Sam direct access to various east coast crime families that were aligned with the Buffalo Mafia such as those based in Rochester and Utica, New York and in Northeastern Pennsylvania. Sam was known to use these connections to further his gambling and bookmaking interests, to fence stolen goods and possibly for narcotics operations he was overseeing or involved in. He was a cousin of mobster Al Tornabene.

Carlisi started his criminal career with the Outfit as a driver for mobster Joseph Aiuppa when he was boss of the Cicero, Illinois crew. He is the uncle to Chicago Outfit mobsters Dominick DiMaggio and Nicholas DiMaggio.
When Aiuppa was convicted in 1986 for the skimming of the Las Vegas casinos, Carlisi served as his replacement and as a front man. Carlisi earned his nickname "Wings" because he often flew around the country as a mob courier during the 1970s. When Ferriola became the boss of the Outfit, Carlisi served as his underboss. This followed the murders of Michael and Tony Spilotro, in which Carlisi had supposedly been involved.
 
After Ferriola was diagnosed with cancer, he assigned the day-to-day supervision of the Outfit to Carlisi. After Ferriola died, Carlisi became the new boss. In March 1996, Carlisi was convicted of mob racketeering, loansharking, and arson in connection with an illegal gambling business in the Chicago area and the West suburbs and was sentenced to 13 years in prison. Convicted with Carlisi were his chauffeur James "Little Jimmy" Marcello, Anthony Zizzo, Anthony Chiaramonti.  On January 2, 1997, Carlisi died with fluid in his lungs as he was being force rushed/dragged out of a prison unit to a waiting golf cart. This caused heart attack while in prison.

References

External links
The Mob & Friends - Sam "Black Sam"/"Wings" Carlisi Profile

1914 births
1997 deaths
Chicago Outfit bosses
American gangsters of Italian descent
People convicted of racketeering
American people who died in prison custody
Prisoners who died in United States federal government detention